Allen Alfred Van (March 30, 1915 – August 27, 1995) was an American ice hockey player who competed in the Olympic games in 1952. He was a member of the national team that won the silver medal in Oslo.

References

1915 births
1995 deaths
Ice hockey players at the 1952 Winter Olympics
Olympic silver medalists for the United States in ice hockey
Medalists at the 1952 Winter Olympics